Mount Bintumani (also known as Loma Mansa) is the highest peak in Sierra Leone and the Loma Mountains, at .  It lies in the Loma Mountains and its lower slopes are covered in rainforests, home to a wide variety of animals.  These include pygmy hippopotamuses, dwarf crocodiles, rufous fishing-owls and numerous primates.

See also
 List of Ultras of Africa

References

Inselbergs of Africa
Mountains of Sierra Leone
Highest points of countries